Jason David Marshall in an American college baseball coach and former shortstop. Marshall played college baseball at Texas A&M University from 1989 to 1992 for coach Mark Johnson. He was then drafted in the 13th round by the Kansas City Royals, where he played in their organization from 1992 to 1995. Marshall was the head baseball coach at the University of Texas at San Antonio from 2013 to 2019.

Playing career
Marshall played at Texas A&M as a shortstop from 1989 through 1992.  In his senior season, he was named Aggies Most Valuable Player after leading the team in hits, runs, RBI, and games played.  He was drafted in the 13th round of the 1992 MLB Draft by the Kansas City Royals and played four seasons in the Royals system.

Coaching career
After ending his playing career, Marshall served as an assistant at Texas A&M for two seasons. While there, he also served as an assistant coach of the Cotuit Kettleers of the Cape Cod Baseball League in 1997. He then moved to McMurry for three years before earning an assistant position at UTSA. He added associate head coach duties after three years, and also served as recruiting coordinator and infielders coach. He was elevated to the head coaching position on June 18, 2012. Marshall guided the Roadrunners a berth in the 2013 NCAA Division I baseball tournament by winning the 2013 Western Athletic Conference baseball tournament, but failed to return to the postseason ever again. He resigned on May 27, 2019. Marshall was 208–189 as the head coach at UTSA.

Head coaching record
The following lists Marshall's record as a head coach at the Division I level.

References

External links

UTSA Roadrunners bio

Living people
1970 births
Baseball shortstops
McMurry War Hawks baseball coaches
Texas A&M Aggies baseball coaches
Texas A&M Aggies baseball players
Cape Cod Baseball League coaches
UTSA Roadrunners baseball coaches
Appleton Foxes players
Eugene Emeralds players
Wilmington Blue Rocks players
Wichita Wranglers players